Radio Ljubuški is a Hercegovina local public radio station, broadcasting from Ljubuški, Bosnia and Herzegovina.

Radio Ljubuški was launched on 29 April 1992.

Frequencies

 Ljubuški

See also 
List of radio stations in Bosnia and Herzegovina

References

External links 
 www.radioljubuski.ba
 Communications Regulatory Agency of Bosnia and Herzegovina
Ljubuški
Ljubuški
Radio stations established in 1992